Gaozu is an imperial temple name typically used for Chinese emperors who founded a particular dynasty. It may refer to:

Emperors generally referred to as Gaozu
Emperor Gaozu of Han (256 BC or 247 BC – 195 BC)
Emperor Gaozu of Tang (566–635)

Emperors whose temple name was Gaozu
Cao Pi (187–226) of Cao Wei, the temple name was eventually changed to Shizu
Liu Yuan (Han Zhao) (251–310), the temple name was eventually changed to Taizu
Shi Le (274–333) of Later Zhao
Fu Jian (317–355) of Former Qin
Qifu Gangui (died in 412) of Western Qin
Yao Xing (366–416) of Later Qin
Liu Yu (Emperor Wu of Liu Song) (363–422)
Yuan Hong (Emperor Xiaowen of Northern Wei) (467–499)
Emperor Wu of Liang (464–549)
Emperor Wu of Chen (503–559)
Emperor Wu of Northern Zhou (543–578)
Yang Jian (Emperor Wen of Sui) (541–604) of the Sui dynasty
Wang Jian (Former Shu) (847–918) of Former Shu
Yang Longyan (897–920) of Wu (Ten Kingdoms)
Meng Zhixiang (874–934) of Later Shu
Liu Yan (emperor) (889–942) of Southern Han
Shi Jingtang (892–942) of the Later Jin (Five Dynasties)
Liu Zhiyuan (895–948) of the Later Han (Five Dynasties)
Chen Youliang (1320–1363) of Great Han

Others
It may also refer to those who never officially declared themselves as emperors, but were posthumously given the title by their imperial descendants:
Sima Yi (179–251)
Zhang Shi (Former Liang) (died in 320), Emperor Gaozu of Former Liang (320–376)
Murong Hui (269–333), Emperor Gaozu of Former Yan (337–370)
Gao Huan (496–547), Emperor Taizu of Northern Qi (550–577)

See also 
 Kao Tsu (disambiguation)
 Taizu (disambiguation) (similar meaning; some emperors have been called both)
 Taizong (disambiguation)
 Shizu (disambiguation)

Ancient Chinese institutions
Temple name disambiguation pages